Forced public apologies in Russia are a practice of publishing videos in which a person or their relatives ask forgiveness for their words or actions. Usually the apologies are given under pressure, including threats and torture. The practice is particularly widespread in Chechnya and the North Caucasus.

History
Cases of coercion to public apologies happened in the post-Soviet states before, and not only in Russia; for example, in February 2014 fighters of Ukrainian «Berkut» were forced to ask for forgiveness for their actions against Euromaidan.

After Russian protests against Navalny's imprisonment in 2021, Russian security services published apologies of protestors, many of which appeared to have been given under duress. According to anthropologist Aleksandra Arkhipova, apologizing on camera damages the protester's image and lowers their support by the public.

Use in Chechnya

The systematic practice began in 2007 in Chechnya. On December 18, 2015, Grozny TV channel showed a video in which a local woman, Ayshat Inayeva, was sitting with the members of the Chechen government and asked for forgiveness for her words, blaming them on «clouded mind». Before, Inayeva published a sound recording, in which she denounced the «showing off» of the regional government against the background of bribery and poverty of the common citizens. Two days later, a video was published in Facebook in which a Chechen man Adam Dikayev was walking on a treadmill without pants and singing "My best friend is president Putin". A week before, Dikayev criticized an Instagram video in which Ramzan Kadyrov was jogging with this song playing in the background. In his apology video, Dikayev said: "They found me, took off my pants". Soon, apology videos became common, Grozny TV even tried to create a special TV show for them. Chechens are forced to apologize on camera for complaints on the actions of the authorities, requests for help, hiring witch doctors, crying on a wedding, and many other things.

In Chechnya, the forced apologies are a method of control over the society: as Chechen people value honour very high, so the humiliation implied by the apology may be worse than death. Human rights activists claim that some Chechen siloviki specialize in forcing the apologies. According to them, the people who decline to apologize are imprisoned, beaten, or killed. The Minister of Information of Chechnya, Akhmed Dudayev, explained the government version of the method of obtaining the apologies: the authorities contact the person; explain how they violated the Chechen traditions; having understood that, the person publishes the apology. The public apology practice went beyond the borders of Chechnya, when Kadyrov published a recording of an apology from Krasnoyarsk deputy Konstantin Senchenko. The deputy apologized after meeting a wrestler Buvaisar Saitiev. Later, Kadyrov published an apology from the head rabbi of Moscow, Pinchas Goldschmidt. "Apologies to Kadyrov" became so frequent that they became a meme.

From Chechnya, the practice of apologizing spread to neighboring republics. A famous  wrestler Khabib Nurmagomedov demanded apologies while campaigning for protections of Dagestani traditions. The scale of the practice in the Caucasus led news website Caucasian Knot to begin a chronicle of the apologies; in 2020, there were more than 50 of high-profile public apologies in the Caucasus. The practice was adopted by security services in other Russian regions, as they started to release repentant videos of hooligans and those blamed of spreading fake news about COVID-19 epidemic.

References

External links
 Практика извинений в Чечне прививает людям привычку к самоцензуре. Caucasian Knot

Chechnya
Human rights in Russia
Human rights in Chechnya